is a railway station in the city of Kariya, Aichi Prefecture, Japan, operated by Central Japan Railway Company (JR Tōkai).

Lines
Higashi-Kariya Station is served by the Tōkaidō Main Line, and is located 338.1 kilometers from the starting point of the line at Tokyo Station.

Station layout
The station has two opposed side platforms connected by a footbridge. The station building has automated ticket machines, TOICA automated turnstiles and is staffed.

Platforms

Adjacent stations

Station history
Higashi-Kariya Station opened on December 24, 1966 as a passenger station of the Japanese National Railways (JNR). With the privatization and dissolution of JNR on April 1, 1987, the station came under the control of the Central Japan Railway Company.

Station numbering was introduced to the section of the Tōkaidō Line operated JR Central in March 2018; Higashi-Kariya Station was assigned station number CA56.

Passenger statistics
In fiscal 2017, the station was used by an average of 5468 passengers daily.

Surrounding area
 Japan National Route 23
Chiryu Minami Junior High School

See also
 List of Railway Stations in Japan

References

Yoshikawa, Fumio. Tokaido-sen 130-nen no ayumi. Grand-Prix Publishing (2002) .

External links

JR-Tokai home page 

Railway stations in Japan opened in 1966
Railway stations in Aichi Prefecture
Tōkaidō Main Line
Stations of Central Japan Railway Company
Kariya, Aichi